The Board of Intermediate and Secondary Education, Cumilla is an autonomous organization that is responsible for holding public examinations (Junior School Certificate (J.S.C.), Secondary School Certificate (S.S.C.), and Higher Secondary (School) Certificate (H.S.C)) in the Cumilla District and five nearby districts of Cumilla Division. The board was established in 1962 under the East Pakistan Intermediate and Secondary Education (Amendment) Ordinance, 1962.

The present chairperson of the board is Professor Md Abdus Salam .

District under Cumilla Education Board
Brahmanbaria District
Chandpur District
Comilla District
Feni District
Lakshmipur District
Noakhali District

Prominent educational institutions 
Prominent educational institutions under the board are following:

See also
 List of Intermediate and Secondary Education Boards in Bangladesh
 List of Educational Institutions in Cumilla

References

External links

 Official Website
 Education Boards of Bangladesh
 Directorate of Secondary and Higher Education in Bangladesh

Education in Cumilla
1962 establishments in East Pakistan
Education Board in Bangladesh
Government boards of Bangladesh